The Gaturi (Harari: ጋቱሪ), also spelled as Gatouri are an extinct ethnic group that once inhabited present-day eastern Ethiopia.

History
According to Mohammed Hassan, the Gaturi were a Semitic-speaking people who resided in the region of mount Kundudo and Babile, the region that formed part of the little principality of Dawaro. 

The Harari chronicle states Abadir arrived at an Islamic region called Bandar Gaturi known later as Harar in the tenth or thirteenth century. In Harar, Abadir encountered the Gaturi alongside the Harla and Argobba people. Gaturi is claimed by one source to be a Harla sub clan. According to another Harari tradition seven clans and villages united against a common adversary including Gaturi to form Harar city-state. 

In the middle ages during the Ethiopian-Adal war, one of the leaders of the Muslim forces of Malassay was Amir Husain bin Abubaker al-Gaturi. Ahmad ibn Ibrahim al-Ghazi designated Amir Husain al-Gaturi as governor of Dawaro region which Ulrich Braukämper states was a border province of Abyssinia. 

Gaturi ceased to be mentioned in texts after the sixteenth century. Gaturi is today represented as a sub group of the Harari people and remains a Harari surname.

Language
They spoke Gaturi language, possibly an extinct South Ethiopic grouping within the Semitic subfamily of the Afroasiatic languages and closely related to Harari and Argobba languages.

See also
Gafat people, an extinct ethnic group in western Ethiopia

References 

Ethnic groups in Ethiopia
Afroasiatic peoples
Extinct ethnic groups